Giselher was a king of Burgundy in the Nibelungenlied, brother to kings Gunther and Gundomar I (also called Gernot). Historically, these correspond to three sons of king Gebicca, Gundomar, Gislaharius (Giselher) and Gundaharius  (Gunther), who ruled the Burgundians in the 410s. His name means "pledged warrior".

In the Nibelungenlied, he is betrothed to Dietlind, the daughter of Count Rüdiger of Bechelaren. He died sometime before 436. He was likely the second son of Gebicca, not the third as is reported in the Nibelungenlied. He was succeeded by his brother Gundaharius.

External links
 Giselher (in German)

Kings of the Burgundians
German heroic legends
Nibelung tradition
5th-century monarchs in Europe
Year of birth unknown
430s deaths